Noel Fisher (26 February 1912 – 21 May 1985) was an  Australian rules footballer who played with Fitzroy in the Victorian Football League (VFL).

Notes

External links 
		

1912 births
1985 deaths
Australian rules footballers from Victoria (Australia)
Fitzroy Football Club players
Colac Football Club players